Björn Borg was the defending champion, but did not compete this year.

Jimmy Connors won the title by defeating Vitas Gerulaitis 6–5, 6–0, 6–4 in the final.

Connors did not lose a single match in the entire tournament, despite being played in a round-robin system.

Draw

Final

Round-robin

References

External links
 Official results archive (ATP)
 Official results archive (ITF)

1979 Singles